Dee Jay Mailer is the chief executive officer of Kamehameha Schools. She was appointed on January 19, 2004, and now focuses her energies on educating children of Hawaiian ancestry. She is a 1970 graduate of Kamehameha.

Former work 

As the former Chief Operating Officer of The Global Fund, a private Swiss foundation created by the world’s top developed countries, Mailer, along with the Geneva based team, raised and distributed funds to support the fight against AIDS, tuberculosis and malaria in developing countries. She created and managed the fund’s administrative operations in collaboration with international partners, including the World Bank and World Health Organization. During her tenure, some $3.4 billion was raised from international donors, $33 million of which was disbursed in grant funds to 92 countries.

Mailer’s healthcare career spans 27 years, and includes serving as Chief Executive Officer of Kaiser Permanente Hawai‘i where she implemented a service-oriented culture, which improved health plan member satisfaction and retention rates to the highest levels in the State and within the national Kaiser program.

She left Kaiser in 1999 to become Chief Administrative and Operating Officer of Health Net, Inc., a health insurance program serving 2 million members in the State of California. Mailer later served as Senior Vice President of National Contracting and Claims Best Practices for the company.

Education 

Mailer earned her Bachelor of Science degree in Nursing and her Masters in Business Administration (MBA) from the University of Hawai‘i at Manoa. She is also a graduate of the Kaiser Permanente Executive Program, a business program for national healthcare executives offered in partnership with Stanford University.

Past contributions 

Her past community contributions include being a board member and chairman elect of the Hawai`i Business Roundtable, chairman of the board of the Institute for Human Services Homeless Shelter. She is also a member of several other boards, including the Pacific Research Institute, the Hawai`i Community Foundation, Aloha United Way, and the Junior Achievement School Mentoring Program.

References
--

Kamehameha Schools alumni
Living people
Year of birth missing (living people)
University of Hawaiʻi at Mānoa alumni
American women chief executives
American chief operating officers
21st-century American women